Chorizandra sphaerocephala, the roundhead bristle-sedge, is a species of perennial herb, found in swampy areas in eastern Australia. An erect rush-like plant from 50 to 110 cm tall, it has tough rhizomes and flower from spring to summer. This is one of the many plants first published by Robert Brown with the type known as "(J.) v.v." Appearing in his Prodromus Florae Novae Hollandiae et Insulae Van Diemen in 1810. The specific epithet sphaerocephala refers to the rounded heads.

References

Restionaceae
Flora of New South Wales
Flora of Queensland
Flora of Victoria (Australia)
Plants described in 1810
Taxa named by Robert Brown (botanist, born 1773)